Pilsbryspira nymphia is a species of sea snail, a marine gastropod mollusk in the family Pseudomelatomidae, the turrids and allies.

Description
The length of the shell varies between 12 mm and 18 mm.

Distribution
This species occurs in the Sea of Cortez, Western Mexico to Panama. The type locality is in Baja California.

References

External links
 H. A. Pilsbry and H. N. Lowe, West Mexican and Central American Mollusks Collected by H. N. Lowe, 1929-31; Proceedings of the Academy of Natural Sciences of Philadelphia Vol. 84 (1932), pp. 33-144
 
 Gastropods.com: Nymphispira nymphia

nymphia
Gastropods described in 1932